The  is a four-door executive sedan introduced by Mitsubishi Motors in 1964 to serve as their flagship passenger vehicle in the Japanese market. The word "debonair" means gentle, courteous, suave, lighthearted, or nonchalant.



Overview 
The Debonair was first introduced at the 10th All Japan Motor Show (later renamed the Tokyo Motor Show) in October 1963. Its appearance at the time was described as "dignified". It was one of the first Japanese-built luxury sedans, using a 2.0-liter six-cylinder engine, with exterior dimensions just under the Japanese government dimension regulations for "compact" vehicles while offering a spacious interior.

At its introduction, it was regarded as a luxurious variation of the Colt 1000, as the Galant would not be introduced until 1969, and was the largest sedan Mitsubishi had built to date. In Japan, it was sold at a specific retail chain called the Galant Shop starting in 1969 with the introduction of the Galant. At the time of the Debonair's introduction, Mitsubishi had a market reputation of building small, economical sedans, letting other manufacturers build larger, more expensive sedans. The Debonair was seen as a special purpose vehicle, and not marketed towards the general motoring public. Production began in time for the 1964 Summer Olympics held in Tokyo in October 1964. Mitsubishi had earlier used this approach to build an exclusive vehicle for senior members of Mitsubishi, with the first vehicle built called the Model A.

Three distinct generations were available during its 35-year production run until it was replaced in 1999 with the Proudia in an attempt to continue to offer a top-level luxury sedan. The first and second-generation models were used by senior level executives of the Mitsubishi Group and affiliated companies.

As a result of the Debonair's perceived primary purpose as a "senior executive vehicle", it did not undergo regular improvements to its exterior appearance, while the mechanicals were routinely updated with the latest advancements as the years progressed. The engine displacement was held to the 2.0-liter limit to minimize the annual road tax bill, and if it could be justified that the car was for business use, the tax liability was further reduced. The international introduction of the Honda Legend in 1986 influenced many traditional Japanese luxury sedans to update the appearance of their vehicles, including the Debonair.

First generation (A30/A31/A32/A33; 1964) 

The Debonair was Mitsubishi's competitor to the Nissan Cedric, Prince Gloria, Isuzu Bellel and Toyota Crown, and during the first generation's production, the appearance remained generally unchanged from 1964 until 1986, sharing a tradition with the Toyota Century, that being also recognized as a senior executive sedan exclusive to the Japanese market. Although it received several minor redesigns (denoted I through IV), the vehicle proved popular enough in the Japanese market to remain in production for 22 years without major appearance modifications.

The Debonair was largely the result of former General Motors designer Hans S. Bretzner, while the result was largely influenced by the 1961 Lincoln Continental designed by Elwood Engel, as evidenced by the slab-sided body panels, squared wheel wells, extended protrusions at the front of the vehicle, wraparound turn signals in the front, and tapered fins at the rear, with a rear taillight cluster, exhibiting a "Continental-esque" appearance. It used a double wishbone front suspension with leaf springs and a differential for the rear axle for the entire generation.

The front grille had an "MMC" badge, denoting the newly formed Mitsubishi Motors Corporation. The badge on the front grille was changed to signify the Saturn engine was installed, and a "MCA-Jet" badge was also included. This model received the A31 model code. In October 1973, the Debonair underwent a facelift: the front turn signals were made smaller and moved upwards on the fenders, the front ventilation windows were deleted, and the L-shaped taillights were replaced by rectangular units. The model code was not changed.

The 1976 model saw the removal of a manual transmission, leaving the only choice of a 3-speed automatic unit, sourced from Borg-Warner. When the 4G54 "Astron" (2,555 cc) four-cylinder engine was introduced June 1976, the trim package was renamed "Executive SE" and the model code became A32. The Debonair received additional technical advancements such as anti-lock braking system in 1979. The badge on the front grille was again changed to signify the engines displacement of "2600" and the "Astron 80" update. These were replaced by "MMC" badges in November 1982.

In April 1978, responding to tightened emissions standards, Mitsubishi introduced a de-smogged model using Mitsubishi MCA and the chassis code was changed to A33.

The first-generation Debonair continued in production until the first quarter of 1986. By the end, its availability was largely academical: in its last full year of production (1985), 205 units were sold in Japan.

Second generation (S11A/S12A; 1986) 

In July 1986, Mitsubishi changed the appearance of the Debonair, as its previous version was seen as extremely rare and not a sales leader or image maker of Mitsubishi vehicles. The second-generation Debonair adopted a front-wheel drive layout, a cost-effective way to increase interior space without investing money on engineering in an executive sedan. It also came with Mitsubishi's first V6 engines, the 6G71 2.0-liter and the 6G72 3.0-liter under the "Cyclone" moniker, which were shared with the Galant model line later. So as to comply with the Japanese government regulations concerning exterior dimensions and engine displacement, vehicles installed with the 2.0-liter engine were installed in a shorter and narrower body–accomplished by fitting smaller bumpers. Fitted with the  3.0-liter V6 engine, the Debonair would reach , if it wasn't for the mandatory  limiter used in Japanese cars.

The Debonair took full advantage of the front-wheel drive layout to allow for much passenger space. The cavernous trunk was also designed so as to ensure that two sets of golf clubs could be carried. The Debonair was a reasonable success; sales in its first full year (1987) were 6,230 cars in Japan, compared to a mere 205 of its predecessor in 1985.

A  supercharged version of the 2.0-liter engine was added to the lineup in February 1987, using the world's first needle roller rocker arm assembly. This generation was badge engineered and was introduced to the Asian luxury car market as the Hyundai Grandeur, giving Hyundai a luxury sedan to shuttle foreign dignitaries during the 1988 Seoul Olympics. As Mitsubishi and Chrysler had a business relationship where automotive technology was being shared and used in both Chrysler and Mitsubishi products, this generation Debonair does have some superficial similarities with the Chrysler New Yorker of the same time period. The Debonair's platform, however, shares nothing with the Chrysler "E", "Y", or "K" platforms. The suspension was upgraded to MacPherson struts for the front suspension, and the rear suspension used a three-link torsion axle. The only transmission available was a four-speed automatic unit.

Unusually for Japan, there was also a full stretch limousine version available briefly, beginning in 1987.

This generation was also the first to install a V6 engine, and the car was called the Debonair V, with a badge on the back of the trunk, and a "V" hood ornament. The name also continued the naming of the various iterations of the previous generation Debonair by Roman numerals I, II, III, and IV, an approach shared with the North American Lincoln Mark series and the Jaguar Mark 1 on a luxury car. The Roman numeral identification approach was also used on Mitsubishi's top-of-the-line sports car, the Starion to identify specific trim packages. In the third quarter of 1989, a twin-cam version of the 3.0-liter V6 engine with four valves per cylinder was introduced, by which time the supercharged 2.0-liter unit was dropped as the regular 2.0-liter engine received a power upgrade. This engine became the only option for the AMG version. Top speed for the 24-valve 3.0-liter V6 engine is  according to period sources.

In 1990, the Debonair was joined by a newer, more modern looking and sporting executive sedan, called the Diamante (also known as the Sigma) in an attempt to keep Mitsubishi competitive with newer executive sedans, such as the Honda Legend and other Japanese luxury sedans as the Debonair continued to be perceived as dated in appearance. The motivation to introduce a modern looking, executive level luxury sedan also took place in what has become known as the Japanese asset price bubble period that began after the Plaza Accord agreement in 1985.

German tuner AMG was brought in to enhance this version of the Debonair, which primarily consisted of exterior body treatments. The AMG version came in two configurations; the standard length and later the Debonair V 150 AMG, with  added to the wheelbase. The "150" limousine (only with the 3.0-liter engine) was first shown in October 1990. In the Japanese crime drama TV show Gorilla, a Debonair AMG is used. British luxury apparel manufacturer Aquascutum was also commissioned to design an exclusive interior appearance package for the Debonair, soon after the company had been purchased by Japanese textile conglomerate company Renown Incorporated; the supercharger was installed optionally with this particular trim package.

Even after the introduction of the more modern Diamante, the Debonair underwent one last facelift, mostly in order to update the passive safety of the car. Along with light cosmetic changes, this took place in May 1991. By October 1992, production of the second-generation model had ended as the third-generation Debonair was being introduced.

Third generation (S22A/S26A/S27A; 1992) 

The third-generation Debonair debuted in late 1992, which were longer and wider than its predecessors. The wider range of available engines was topped by a  3,496 L 6G74 DOHC V6 engine, and as Mitsubishi's domestic flagship incorporated much of the company's technology. It was introduced after the more mainstream 1990 Diamante.

Some of the technologies used were:
 Four-wheel steering
 Four-wheel anti-lock braking system
 Electronically-controlled suspension
 GPS-guided automotive navigation system
 Rear-focused camera
 Self-closing doors
 Lidar-based distance detection system (Japanese market only). Marketed as "distance warning", this early system only warned the driver about vehicles ahead, without influencing throttle, brakes or gearshifting.
 INVECS 5-speed automatic transmission with traction control system

Vehicles installed with the 3.5-liter V6 engine were longer, while the wheelbase remained unchanged for the regular versions. As this generation was Mitsubishi's flagship model, the body style that was compliant with Japanese government regulations concerning exterior dimensions and engine displacement was no longer offered. The rear suspension was upgraded to a multilink approach. Much of the technology installed in this generation Debonair was shared with the GTO/3000GT.

There were a multitude of trim packages with varying levels of equipment. The trim level names started with Executive (I, II, and III), Exceed, Exceed Contega, and Exceed Type A, B, and C. Each model year rearranged the trim level names according to the perceived market conditions.

The Debonair was discontinued in November 1999 and directly replaced by the Proudia. However, Mitsubishi also developed its first V8 engine for the Dignity limousine around this time, and it was this latter model which took position as the domestic flagship of the company.

References

External links 

Official history of the Debonair, Mitsubishi Motors South Africa website

Debonair
Cars introduced in 1964
1970s cars
1980s cars
1990s cars
Executive cars
Sedans
Rear-wheel-drive vehicles
Front-wheel-drive vehicles
Vehicles with four-wheel steering
Flagship vehicles
Cars of Japan